Willi Voss (born on 9 May 1934 as Willi Pohl) and sometimes writing under the pseudonym E. W. Pless, is a German writer. In the 1970s he was known as a neo-Nazi and as a PLO member, a procurer of weapons for Palestinian terrorist attacks. After defecting from the PLO, he became an informant for the CIA and returned later to Germany. Before becoming a writer, he worked as a laborer, librarian, and journalist.

Biography 
Willi Pohl grew up in the Ruhr region. In the 1970s, he was a member of the German neo-Nazi scene, with ties to the criminal milieu and to Palestinian terrorists. The contact had been established by the neo-Nazi Udo Albrecht, with whom Pohl was friends for several years. As a PLO member, he organized weapons for Palestinian terrorist commandos in Germany. Pohl helped the terrorist of the Palestinian organization Black September Organization, Abu Daoud in the planning and execution of the 1972 Munich attacks, according to his own account unknowingly. After the assassination, he planned to take hostages in Vienna's St. Stephen's Cathedral and in parallel in Cologne Cathedral on Christmas 1972 in order to ransom the three surviving Munich assassins. Since the preparatory smuggling of weapons was exposed by an informant, he was arrested by the Bavarian police at the end of October 1972 with weapons and a threatening letter from Black September. Three days after his arrest came the hijacking of Lufthansa Flight 615, which was used to ransom the Palestinian terrorists. Pohl's hopes of also being ransomed were not fulfilled.

"Despite the overwhelming evidence, Pohl was sentenced in 1974 to a prison term of two years and two months only for unlawful possession of weapons. Four days after the judge's verdict, the terrorist accomplice was already free again and departed for Beirut."

In December 2012, Der Spiegel reported that Pohl, according to his own statements, had spied on the headquarters of the PLO intelligence service as an agent for the CIA since 1975, after defecting from the PLO. Under the alias Ganymede, he is said to have provided information on attacks in the Middle East and Europe and on cooperation between the neo-Nazi Udo Albrecht and his accomplices with the Palestinians.

He returned to Germany from the Middle East in the late 1970s, after being captured by Christian militias in Lebanon and released in a prisoner exchange. He had received a remission from the authorities in return for his information. Back in Germany, he wrote as a freelance writer, mostly under his current name Willi Voss, but sometimes also under the pseudonym E.W. Pless. He wrote Western stories and Jerry Cotton novels, in addition to a number of crime novels and political thrillers, which were published by Bastei-Lübbe and Ullstein Verlag, among others. He has also written screenplays for episodes of the shows Großstadtrevier and Tatort.

He received an award for his novel Gegner in the Konsalik Novel Prize competition. With the book Das Gesetz des Dschungels (The Law of the Jungle), he won third place in the national competition for the  German Crime Fiction Award in 1989.

Bibliography

As E. W. Pless 

 Geblendet. Aus den authentischen Papieren eines Terroristen. Schweizer Verlagshaus, Zürich 1979, ISBN 3-7263-6217-7.
 Gegner. Schweizer Verlagshaus, Zürich 1983. ISBN 3-7263-6377-7
 Signum F. Rehkugler u. Voss, Reutlingen 1986. ISBN 3-926062-00-2

As Willi Voss 

 Tränen schützen nicht vor Mord. Bastei Lübbe, Bergisch Gladbach 1982. ISBN 3-404-36059-1
 Frost im Blut. Bastei Lübbe, Bergisch Gladbach 1984. ISBN 3-404-37016-3
 Der stirbt von selbst. Bastei Lübbe, Bergisch Gladbach 1984. ISBN 3-404-37022-8
 Keine Tränen für das Opfer. Bastei Lübbe, Bergisch Gladbach 1985. ISBN 3-404-37033-3
 Auch Narren sterben einsam. Bastei Lübbe, Bergisch Gladbach 1986. ISBN 3-404-10778-0
 Das Gesetz des Dschungels. Ullstein, Frankfurt/M. 1988. ISBN 3-548-10565-3
 Die Nacht, der Tod. Ullstein, Frankfurt/M. 1990. ISBN 3-548-10658-7
 Pforte des Todes. Pendragon, Bielefeld 2009. ISBN 978-3-86532-154-1
 Bitteres Blut. Sutton, Erfurt 2011. ISBN 978-3-86680-958-1
 UnterGrund aavaa, Berlin 2012. ISBN 978-3-944223-00-1

References 

1934 births
Living people
20th-century German male writers
German crime fiction writers
German neo-Nazis
Palestine Liberation Organization members